Organizational behavior management (OBM) is a subdiscipline of applied behavior analysis (ABA), which is the application of behavior analytic principles and contingency management techniques to change behavior in organizational settings. Through these principles and assessment of behavior, OBM seeks to analyze and employ antecedent, influencing actions of an individual before the action occurs, and consequence, what happens as a result of someone’s actions, interventions which influence behaviors linked to the mission and key objectives of the organization and its workers. Such interventions have proven effective through research in improving common organizational areas including employee productivity, delivery of feedback, safety, and overall morale of said organization.

History 
OBM is a subdiscipline of ABA, thus its emergence stems from the foundations of behavior analysis developed by B.F. Skinner. Skinner’s book Science and Human Behavior, published in 1953, served as the foundation for OBM by highlighting the use of money to increase desired behaviors, wage schedules, and higher levels of praise for desired behaviors as opposed to undesired behaviors. Skinner’s greatest contributions to the emergence of OBM however was introducing programmed instruction to the educational system. Aspects of programmed instruction proved beneficial in organizational settings, particularly training. This later became the first application of behavioral principles in the organizational settings.

Emergence of research in OBM sparked in the 1960s with publication of Owen Aldis’ paper “Of Pigeons and Men” in which he proposes using reinforcement schedules in industries as the first OBM article published in the 1961 Harvard Business Review.

Journal of Organizational Behavior Management 
Founded in 1977, the Journal of Organizational Behavior Management (JOBM) served as a milestone in the field of Organizational Behavior Management. With Aubrey Daniels as editor and Larry Miller as manager editor, the first board of editors for JOBM was composed of twenty-five individuals. Various names were used to describe the application of behavioral principles in organizational settings but the birth of JOBM solidified the use of the term Organizational Behavior Management to describe such applications in such settings.

JOBM is periodical journal which seeks to publish research and review articles which apply principles of ABA to improve organizations through behavior change. Areas addressed throughout JOBM include performance measurement, performance level interventions, goal setting, feedback, incentive programs, and evidence-based management. In 2003, the ISI Impact Factor of JOBM was ranked third in the Journal Citation Reports ranking of journals in applied psychology further establishing JOBM as a high-quality journal.

Presently, the editorial board of JOBM consist of 72 members with Dr. Ramona Houmanfar serving as editor.

History of educational advancements in OBM
The first university to offer a graduate program in OBM and systems analysis was Western Michigan University, under the instruction of Dick Malott.

Another early program in OBM was initiated at the University of Notre Dame in 1975 with the arrival of Martin Wikoff, the first graduate student in the program. Prior to attending Notre Dame, Wikoff, with University of Washington professors, Bob Kohlenberg (Psychology) and Terrance Mitchell (Foster School of Business) conducted one of the first controlled studies of applied behavior analysis in business; in this case, to improve grocery clerk performance. This study was presented at the 1976 MABA Convention in Chicago. Its application to business was so novel that the research was assigned to the topic category of "Experimental Living Arrangements", confirming its status as one of the pioneering OBM documented applications. The Wikoff-Crowell-Anderson Notre Dame OBM research team was born.

Interventions in OBM

Antecedent interventions 
Antecedents in OBM are simply defined as triggers that evoke behavior by presenting something in the workers environment that will increase the likelihood the behavior will occur. These interventions can be used to address an array of behaviors which ultimately benefit the organization and workers of the organization. The intervention used is determined by the behavior(s) being targeted and whether or not the organization has a desire for the behavior to be exhibited in the work setting or not. The interventions are categorized by what is done to influence behavior.

More commonly used antecedent interventions involve combining task clarification, job aids, and goal setting. Task clarification interventions are used and designed to provide specific job requirements for employees by clarifying and prompting employee behavior. Previous studies which implement task clarification involve using items such as memos and checklists to ensure tasks are completed. Job aids interventions involve prompts, or addition of items in the work environment such as signs, remind workers whether or not a behavior should occur. When combined, goal setting is can then be introduced to establish a standard to how well workers must perform within a given time frame. While the use of antecedent interventions one of the most common strategies, the strategies set the occasion for behavior, but do not maintain them. That aspect of OBM falls to consequence interventions.

Consequence interventions 
Consequence is defined as a change in the environment that follow a worker’s behavior which increases the likelihood the behavior will continue to be exhibited in the future. Consequences interventions in OBM play a primary role in maintaining behavior, and are seen as the one of the most important aspects of OBM.

In OBM, feedback is a common and successful intervention method used in organizational settings. A study in 2012 found that feedback was the research of interest in over 70% of studies published in JOBM. This is due to the various types of feedback delivery which can be tailored to the organization and its goals in addition to having numerous research articles which provide empirical evidence of its effectiveness. Such types include feedback on individual performance, group performance, previous individual performance, previous group performance, and different group’s performance.

Regardless of the which consequence intervention used, an important element of the OBM intervention involves using one of the principles of ABA known as reinforcement. This is due to the fact that when a behavior is reinforced, it is likely to continue to be exhibited in similar conditions to which the behavior was reinforced. Behaviors which will be reinforced it determined by the organizational setting and its goals.

Management

Scientific management
OBM might be seen as one of the distant branches of scientific management, originally inspired by Taylor. The principal difference between scientific management and OBM might be on the conceptual underpinnings: OBM is based on B.F. Skinner's science of human behavior. Because different people behave differently in the same situation, studies from multiple disciplines using multiple research methods create confusion, hindering a unified concept of organizational behavior.

Quality management
The parallel between OBM tools and the process and procedures common to the so-called Quality Movement (SPC, Deming, Quality Circles, ISO, etc.) was documented by Wikoff in his ISPI Article of the Year, the quality movement meets performance technology.

Relationship with industrial and organizational psychology 
While OBM and industrial and organizational (IO) psychology both take place in organizational setting, the two areas differ in ways such as theoretical basis, areas of interest/research, research methods, and publication of research.

IO is seen as its own field and is described as the scientific study of working and applying the science to the workplace to address issues of relevance on the individual and organizational level, many of which use on self-report. OBM is seen as a subdiscipline of ABA thus deriving the principles from the field as opposed to IO. While the areas of interest for both fields work to improve organizations, IO psychology primary areas of interest are among worker personnel selection and placement, cognitive processes, attitudes, and leadership qualities. OBM areas of interest focus on observable behavior such as goal setting, feedback, job aids, improving safe behaviors in the workforce.

Research in IO psychology primarily consist of between-group statistical designs and analyses while using surveys and laboratory simulations. OBM research primarily practices within-subject research methods and designs with visual inspection of research through graphs. Research in IO psychology is published through the Society for Industrial Organizational Psychology (SIOP) while research in OBM is published in the JOBM.

References

External links
 Journal of Organizational Behavior Management (JOBM)
 http://www.obmnetwork.com/
Adherence Management Coaching

Organizational behavior